The 2018 Liverpool City Council election took place on 3 May 2018 to elect members of Liverpool City Council in England. This was on the same day as other local elections.

Council composition
Prior to the election the composition of the council was:

After the election the composition of the council was:

Election Results

Overall election result

Overall result compared with 2016.

Ward Results

Allerton and Hunts Cross

Anfield

Belle Vale

Central

Childwall

Church

Thomas Burton, the Conservative party candidate for Church ward was ineligible to sit as a councillor as he was a Liverpool City Council employee.

Clubmoor

County

Cressington

Croxteth

Everton

Fazakerley

Greenbank

Kensington and Fairfield

Three days before the election, Green Candidate Steve Faragher resigned from the Green Party due to an online comment. This was too late for the ballot paper to be changed.

Kirkdale

Knotty Ash

After voting against the Labour Council Group Budget, Cllr. Alison Clarke resigned the Labour Whip on 22nd April 2022 and joined the Community Independent Group.

Alison Clark resigned as a councillor on 10 November 2022.

Mossley Hill

Norris Green

Old Swan

Picton

Prince's Park

Riverside

St. Michael's

Speke-Garston

Tuebrook & Stoneycroft

Warbreck

Wavertree

West Derby

Woolton

Yew Tree

See also

 Liverpool City Council
 Liverpool Town Council elections 1835 - 1879
 Liverpool City Council elections 1880–present
 Mayors and Lord Mayors of Liverpool 1207 to present
 History of local government in England
 Elections in the United Kingdom

Notes

• italics denote a sitting councillor • bold denotes the winning candidate

References

2018 English local elections
2018
2010s in Liverpool